The 2021 Chinese Artistic Gymnastics Championships were held from May 4-9, 2021 in Chengdu, Sichuan. They also served as the qualifier for the gymnastics event at the 2021 National Games of China.

Women's medalists

Men's medalists

Olympic Training Squads 
After the competition, gymnasts were named to the Olympic training squads based on one of four criteria: a top-eight all-around placement at these championships, membership on the Chinese teams at the 2019 World Championships, high placements at the FIG World Cup series, or high potential as determined by the national team coaches. These squads included:

References

Chinese Artistic Gymnastics Championships
2021 in Chinese sport
Chinese Artistic Gymnastics Championships